Postmodern Culture is an electronic academic journal established in 1990. It is the result of an early experiment in electronic content delivery via the Internet. The journal publishes commentary and criticism on a wide range of concerns including literary theory, politics, and contemporary society. Occasionally, the journal will feature special issues centered on a specific theme within the arena of postmodernism. It is published three times a year in September, January, and May by the Johns Hopkins University Press. The current editor is Eyal Amiran (University of California-Irvine).

External links 
 
 Postmodern Culture at Project MUSE

Publications established in 1990
Triannual journals
Cultural journals
English-language journals
Johns Hopkins University Press academic journals